This is a 'list of LGBT and LGBT-friendly fraternities and sororities. LGBT fraternities and sororities have existed since the 1980s, with Delta Phi Upsilon being established in 1985 and Delta Lambda Phi in 1986. These groups are intended to provide members with access to Greek life without fear of homophobic reprisal or behavior by fellow members, resulting from a history of homophobia within longer-established organizations. 

In addition to groups established for LBGT members, in the 21st century, many Greek letter organizations have become LGBT-friendly by adopting diversity and inclusivity statements. In addition, some single-sex or co-educational fraternities and sororities have become gender-inclusive.

LGBT sororities and women's fraternities
Following are LGBT-specific sororities and women's fraternities.

LGBT fraternities 
Following are LGBT-specific fraternities.

Organizations for all genders  
The following Greek letter organizations are gender-inclusive, meaning they accept males, females, trans, non-binary, etc. into their membership. This list does not include organizations that self-define as co-educational; although such groups may well be gender-inclusive in practice, they have yet to modify their policies and language to be inclusive at the institutional level.

LBGTQ-inclusive Greek letter organizations 
The following fraternities and sororities have adopted LGBTQ-inclusive policies at the national or institutional level. These policies are openly shared and are specific, rather than general non-discrimination statements.

See also

 Cultural interest fraternities and sororities
 List of social fraternities and sororities

References

Fraternities and sororities
LGBT